A New History of Western Philosophy is a 2010 book by the British philosopher and theologian Anthony Kenny, consisting of a history of Western philosophy from the ancient Greeks to the present day. The book consists of four separate parts which were originally released separately during the period 2004–07. The book is dedicated to memory of Georg Henrik von Wright.

Critics claim Kenny's account of philosophy, while generally good, is quite limited in the Islamic world, focusing only on those works that became important in the Latin tradition.

Summary
The book is split into four parts, plus a general introduction and index/bibliography. Each part begins with an historical chapter outlining the major philosophers and schools of thought of the period in question, followed by several thematic chapters dealing with a particular branch of philosophy e.g. logic, theology, ethics etc.

Part 1: Ancient Philosophy
Originally published in 2004, this part covers the period from the earliest Greek philosophers to the conversion of St Augustine in 387 AD, including:
 The Pre-Socratics
 Socrates, Plato and Aristotle
 Graeco-Roman and Roman philosophers (Cicero, Seneca, Plotinus, Marcus Aurelius, Augustine etc.)
 Graeco-Roman schools of thought (Cynics, Epicureans, Stoics etc.)
 Neo-Platonism

Part 2: Medieval Philosophy
Originally published in 2005, this part covers the post-Augustinian period up to the Lateran Council on 1512, including:
 Augustine, Thomas Aquinas, William Ockham, Duns Scotus
 Jewish and Islamic philosophy
 Medieval theology
 Scholasticism

Part 3: The Rise of Modern Philosophy
Originally published in 2006, this part covers the period of the 16th century - mid-19th century, including:
 The rise of science
 Empiricism
 Descartes, Spinoza, Leibniz, Locke, Hobbes, David Hume, Kant, Hegel

Part 4: Philosophy in the Modern World
Originally published in 2007, this part covers the post-Hegelian period up to the present day, including:
 Materialism
 Utilitarianism
 Pragmatism
 Marxism
 Nietzsche, Schopenhauer, Kierkegaard, Wittgenstein, Heidegger, Derrida, Sartre

Publication

See also
 Lectures on the History of Philosophy by Georg Wilhelm Friedrich Hegel
 A History of Western Philosophy by Bertrand Russell
 A History of Philosophy by Frederick Copleston

References

English-language books
History books about philosophy